The SuperClasico, formerly known as the Honda SuperClasico for sponsorship reasons, and also known as the L.A. Derby or El Clásico Angelino, was a sports rivalry between LA Galaxy and Chivas USA. The rivalry ended in 2014 when Chivas ceased operations. The word "SuperClasico" is an allusion to the Mexican Súper Clásico between Club América and the former Chivas USA's parent club Chivas Guadalajara.

Match history

2005

2006

2007

2008

2009

2010

2011

2012

2013

2014

Summaries 

* – Lamar Hunt U.S. Open Cup match

** – Played at Los Angeles Memorial Coliseum
*** – MLS Cup Playoffs

Other rivalries in the Los Angeles area 

 Major League Baseball: Freeway Series
 National Hockey League: Freeway Face-Off
 National Basketball Association: Lakers–Clippers rivalry
 College sports: UCLA–USC rivalry

Former 

 National Football League: Rams-Raiders rivalry

See also 
 El Tráfico – Current rivalry between LA Galaxy and Los Angeles FC

References 

LA Galaxy
Chivas USA
Major League Soccer rivalries
2005 establishments in California
2014 disestablishments in California
Nicknamed sporting events